Tuszyma  is a village in the administrative district of Gmina Przecław, within Mielec County, Subcarpathian Voivodeship, in south-eastern Poland.

The village has a population of 2,405.

References

Tuszyma